Enrique Segoviano (born December 6, 1944, La Romana, Dominican Republic) is a Dominican-born Mexican television producer and director.  He is best known as director of Chespirito's various 1970s television series as well as for producing and directing the late 1980s-early 1990s variety series Anabel.

Biography
Segoviano began his career on-camera, in the 1966 movie Primer dia de clases. When Television Independiente de Mexico began in 1969, Segoviano was hired as a staff producer and director.  There, he first met Roberto Gomez Bolaños while working on the series Sabado de la fortuna. Then in 1970, Segoviano became director of the Chespirito television series. In 1973, TIM merged with Telesistema Mexicano to become Televisa; Segoviano then stayed with Televisa. His first two Televisa series were El Chavo and El Chapulín Colorado, both starring Chespirito. As camera director of both series, Segoviano became responsible for  special effects.

Segoviano's contract with Chespirito ended in 1978, but not before he directed the movie El Chanfle, released by Televicine (now Videocine) the next year.  By then Chespirito had taken over directorial duties. Also in 1979, Segoviano produced his first post-Chespirito series, Odisea burbujas. This program, which ran until 1984, became a pioneer in its usage of on-screen electronic graphics in its second year on the air. Shortly afterward, other Televisa programs, starting with those produced at Televisa San Angel, where Odisea burbujas and most of Segoviano's other programs were taped, followed suit. Nineteen eighty-four would be the first of two non-consecutive years in which Segoviano would produce and direct three different television series: Hola Mexico!, a precursor to Hoy notable for introducing actress Edith González, and the telenovelas Te amo and Sí, mi amor.

His biggest success of the 1980s as well as the 1990s would be the variety series Anabel. The series made stars of several regulars, namely Anabel Ferreira and Maria Alicia Delgado, whose "Abuela" characterization was introduced on this series. A young Eugenio Derbez was a regular in the show's first few years. For several years during the show's run, he was nominated at the Premios TVyNovelas ceremonies against Raúl Velasco (producer and host of Siempre en Domingo, which was annually preempted for the ceremonies) as producer of Mexico's "best variety series." In 1995, Segoviano again found himself producing three series at the same time:  Anabel, the comedy series Y sin embargo se mueve with Fernando Lujan, and the telenovela Pobre niña rica.

As of 2010 Segoviano remained a successful producer with Televisa. In 2001, he produced the game show 100 mexicanos dijeron, which was based on the American game show Family Feud. He most recently produced Todo el mundo cree que sabe.

Filmography

Television
1968 - Sube, Pelayo, Sube
1968 - Hermanos Coraje (Telenovela)
1968 - Sábados de la Fortuna
1973 - El Chavo (TV series)
1973 - El Chapulín Colorado (TV series)
1973 - Nosotros los pobres (serie de TV)
1978 - El Show de Eduardo Manzano
1979 - Odisea Burbujas (serie de TV)
1981 - La Hora del Saber (serie de TV)
1984 - Hola México!!!
1984 - Te amo y Sí, mi amor (Telenovela)
1986 - Ave Fénix (Telenovela)
1988 - Anabel (serie de TV)
1991 - TVO
1992 - La vida de María Félix
1993 - ¡Llévatelo!
1994 - Y sin embargo... se mueve
1995 - Pobre niña rica (Telenovela)
1997 - Atínale al Precio
2001 - 100 mexicanos dijeron
2006 - Espacio en blanco
2009 - Todo el mundo cree que sabe
2021 - Still alive and well producing

References

External links

Enrique Segoviano at chavodel8.com
Enrique Segoviano's Spanish-language Wikipedia page

1944 births
Living people
Mexican television producers
Mexican television directors
Mexican people of Dominican Republic descent
Naturalized citizens of Mexico
People from Santo Domingo
Dominican Republic emigrants to Mexico